is a former Japanese football player.

Playing career
Uramoto was born in Oita Prefecture on November 13, 1982. After graduating from high school, he joined J2 League club Oita Trinita based in his local in 2001. On October 9, 2002, he debuted as substitute midfielder against Shonan Bellmare. He played 4 matches as substitute midfielder in 2002 season. Trinita also won the champions and was promoted to J1 League. In J1, he played as substitute midfielder from the 89th minute against Sanfrecce Hiroshima on April 8, 2004. However he could only play this match in 2004 season and retired end of 2004 season.

Club statistics

References

External links

1982 births
Living people
Association football people from Ōita Prefecture
Japanese footballers
J1 League players
J2 League players
Oita Trinita players
Association football midfielders